Hasdrubal (Hasdroúbas) is the Latinized form of the Carthaginian name ʿAzrubaʿal (.

It may refer to:

 Hasdrubal I of Carthage was the Magonid king of Ancient Carthage from 530 to 510 BC.
 Hasdrubal, son of Hanno (fl. 250 BC), a Carthaginian commander during the First Punic War
 Hasdrubal the Fair (c. 270 BC – 221 BC), son-in-law of Hamilcar Barca
 Hasdrubal Barca (245–207 BC), son of Hamilcar Barca and brother of Hannibal and Mago
 Hasdrubal Gisco (died 202 BC), another commander in the Second Punic War
 Hasdrubal the Bald, a Carthaginian general in the Second Punic War
 Hasdrubal the Boetharch, the general of Punic forces in the Third Punic War c. 146 BC
 Hasdrubal, commander of the service corps, a Carthaginian officer in the Second Punic War c. 218 BC
 original name of Carthaginian Clitomachus (philosopher) (187/6–110/09 BC)

See also
 Asdrubal, a list of people with the modern given name

Masculine given names
Theophoric names